The National Gallery is an art museum in Trafalgar Square in the City of Westminster, in Central London, England. Founded in 1824, in Trafalgar Square since 1838, it houses a collection of over 2,300 paintings dating from the mid-13th century to 1900.  The current Director of the National Gallery is Gabriele Finaldi.

The National Gallery is an exempt charity, and a non-departmental public body of the Department for Digital, Culture, Media and Sport. Its collection belongs to the government on behalf of the British public, and entry to the main collection is free of charge.

Unlike comparable museums in continental Europe, the National Gallery was not formed by nationalising an existing royal or princely art collection. It came into being when the British government bought 38 paintings from the heirs of John Julius Angerstein in 1824. After that initial purchase, the Gallery was shaped mainly by its early directors, especially Charles Lock Eastlake, and by private donations, which now account for two-thirds of the collection. The collection is smaller than many European national galleries, but encyclopaedic in scope; most major developments in Western painting "from Giotto to Cézanne" are represented with important works. It used to be claimed that this was one of the few national galleries that had all its works on permanent exhibition, but this is no longer the case.

The present building, the third site to house the National Gallery, was designed by William Wilkins. Building took from 1832 to 1838, when it opened. Only the facade onto Trafalgar Square remains essentially unchanged from this time, as the building has been expanded piecemeal throughout its history. Wilkins's building was often criticised for the perceived weaknesses of its design and for its lack of space; the latter problem led to the establishment of the Tate Gallery for British art in 1897. The Sainsbury Wing, a 1991 extension to the west by Robert Venturi and Denise Scott Brown, is a significant example of Postmodernist architecture in Britain.

History

Call for a National Gallery

The late 18th century saw the nationalisation of royal or princely art collections across mainland Europe. The Bavarian royal collection (now in the Alte Pinakothek, Munich) opened to the public in 1779, that of the Medici in Florence around 1789 (as the Uffizi Gallery), and the Museum Français at the Louvre was formed out of the former French royal collection in 1793. Great Britain, however, did not follow other European countries, and the British Royal Collection still remains in the sovereign's possession. In 1777 the British government had the opportunity to buy an art collection of international stature, when the descendants of Sir Robert Walpole put his collection up for sale. The MP John Wilkes argued for the government to buy this "invaluable treasure" and suggested that it be housed in "a noble gallery... to be built in the spacious garden of the British Museum". Nothing came of Wilkes's appeal and 20 years later the collection was bought in its entirety by Catherine the Great; it is now to be found in the State Hermitage Museum in St Petersburg.

A plan to acquire 150 paintings from the Orléans collection, which had been brought to London for sale in 1798, also failed, despite the interest of both the King and the Prime Minister, Pitt the Younger. The twenty-five paintings from that collection now in the Gallery, including "NG1", arrived later by a variety of routes. In 1799 the dealer Noël Desenfans offered a ready-made national collection to the British government; he and his partner Sir Francis Bourgeois had assembled it for the king of Poland, before the Third Partition in 1795 abolished Polish independence. This offer was declined and Bourgeois bequeathed the collection to his old school, Dulwich College, on his death. The collection opened in 1814 in Britain's first purpose-built public gallery, the Dulwich Picture Gallery. The Scottish dealer William Buchanan and the collector Joseph Count Truchsess, both formed art collections expressly as the basis for a future national collection, but their respective offers (both made in 1803) were also declined.

Following the Walpole sale many artists, including James Barry and John Flaxman, had made renewed calls for the establishment of a National Gallery, arguing that a British school of painting could only flourish if it had access to the canon of European painting. The British Institution, founded in 1805 by a group of aristocratic connoisseurs, attempted to address this situation. The members lent works to exhibitions that changed annually, while an art school was held in the summer months. However, as the paintings that were lent were often mediocre, some artists resented the Institution and saw it as a racket for the gentry to increase the sale prices of their Old Master paintings. One of the Institution's founding members, Sir George Beaumont, Bt, would eventually play a major role in the National Gallery's foundation by offering a gift of 16 paintings.

In 1823 another major art collection came on the market, which had been assembled by the recently deceased John Julius Angerstein. Angerstein was a Russian-born émigré banker based in London; his collection numbered 38 paintings, including works by Raphael and Hogarth's Marriage à-la-mode series. On 1 July 1823 George Agar Ellis, a Whig politician, proposed to the House of Commons that it purchase the collection. The appeal was given added impetus by Beaumont's offer, which came with two conditions: that the government buy the Angerstein collection, and that a suitable building was to be found. The unexpected repayment of a war debt by Austria finally moved the government to buy Angerstein's collection, for £57,000.

Foundation and early history

The National Gallery opened to the public on 10 May 1824, housed in Angerstein's former townhouse at No. 100 Pall Mall. Angerstein's paintings were joined in 1826 by those from Beaumont's collection, and in 1831 by the Reverend William Holwell Carr's bequest of 35 paintings. Initially the Keeper of Paintings, William Seguier, bore the burden of managing the Gallery, but in July 1824 some of this responsibility fell to the newly formed board of trustees.

The National Gallery at Pall Mall was frequently overcrowded and hot and its diminutive size in comparison with the Louvre in Paris was a cause of national embarrassment. But Agar Ellis, by then a trustee of the Gallery, appraised the site for being "in the very gangway of London"; this was seen as necessary for the Gallery to fulfil its social purpose. Subsidence in No. 100 caused the Gallery to move briefly to No. 105 Pall Mall, which the novelist Anthony Trollope described as a "dingy, dull, narrow house, ill-adapted for the exhibition of the treasures it held". This in turn had to be demolished for the opening of a road to Carlton House Terrace.

In 1832 construction began on a new building by William Wilkins on the northern half of the site of the old Royal Mews in Charing Cross, after late 1820s transformation of the southern half into Trafalgar Square. The location was a significant one, between the wealthy West End and poorer areas to the east. The argument that the collection could be accessed by people of all social classes outstripped other concerns, such as the pollution of central London or the failings of Wilkins's building, when the prospect of a move to South Kensington was mooted in the 1850s. According to the Parliamentary Commission of 1857, "The existence of the pictures is not the end purpose of the collection, but the means only to give the people an ennobling enjoyment".

From 1837 until 1868 the Royal Academy was housed in the east wing of the building.

Growth under Eastlake and his successors 
15th- and 16th-century Italian paintings were at the core of the National Gallery and for the first 30 years of its existence the Trustees' independent acquisitions were mainly limited to works by High Renaissance masters. Their conservative tastes resulted in several missed opportunities and the management of the Gallery later fell into complete disarray, with no acquisitions being made between 1847 and 1850. A critical House of Commons report in 1851 called for the appointment of a director, whose authority would surpass that of the trustees. Many thought the position would go to the German art historian Gustav Friedrich Waagen, whom the Gallery had consulted on previous occasions about the lighting and display of the collections. However, the man preferred for the job by Queen Victoria, Prince Albert and the Prime Minister, Lord Russell, was the Keeper of Paintings at the Gallery, Sir Charles Lock Eastlake. Eastlake, who was President of the Royal Academy, played an essential role in the foundation of the Arundel Society and knew most of London's leading art experts.

The new director's taste was for the Northern and Early Italian Renaissance masters or "primitives", who had been neglected by the Gallery's acquisitions policy but were slowly gaining recognition from connoisseurs. He made annual tours to the continent and to Italy in particular, seeking out appropriate paintings to buy for the Gallery. In all, he bought 148 pictures abroad and 46 in Britain, among the former such seminal works as Paolo Uccello’s The Battle of San Romano. Eastlake also amassed a private art collection during this period, consisting of paintings that he knew did not interest the trustees. His ultimate aim, however, was for them to enter the National Gallery; this was duly arranged upon his death by his friend and successor as director, William Boxall, and his widow Lady Eastlake.

The Gallery's lack of space remained acute in this period. In 1845 a large bequest of British paintings was made by Robert Vernon; there was insufficient room in the Wilkins building so they were displayed first in Vernon's town house at No. 50 Pall Mall and then at Marlborough House. The Gallery was even less well equipped for its next major bequest, as J.M.W. Turner was to bequeath the entire contents of his studio, excepting unfinished works, to the nation upon his death in 1851. The first 20 of these were displayed off-site in Marlborough House in 1856. Ralph Nicholson Wornum, the Gallery's Keeper and Secretary, worked with John Ruskin to bring the bequest together. The stipulation in Turner's will that two of his paintings be displayed alongside works by Claude is still honoured in Room 15 of the Gallery, but his bequest has never been adequately displayed in its entirety; today the works are divided between Trafalgar Square and the Clore Gallery, a small purpose-built extension to Tate Britain completed in 1985.

The third director, Sir Frederick William Burton, laid the foundations of the collection of 18th-century art and made several outstanding purchases from English private collections. The acquisition in 1885 of two paintings from Blenheim Palace, Raphael's Ansidei Madonna and Van Dyck's Equestrian Portrait of Charles I, with a record-setting grant of £87,500 from the Treasury, brought the Gallery's "golden age of collecting" to an end, as its annual purchase grant was suspended for several years thereafter. When the Gallery purchased Holbein's Ambassadors from the Earl of Radnor in 1890, it did so with the aid of private individuals for the first time in its history. In 1897 the formation of the National Gallery of British Art, known unofficially from early in its history as the Tate Gallery, allowed some British works to be moved off-site, following the precedent set by the Vernon collection and the Turner Bequest. Works by artists born after 1790 were moved to the new gallery on Millbank, which allowed Hogarth, Turner and Constable to remain in Trafalgar Square.

Early 20th century

The agricultural crisis at the turn of the 20th century caused many aristocratic families to sell their paintings, but the British national collections were priced out of the market by American plutocrats. This prompted the foundation of the National Art Collections Fund, a society of subscribers dedicated to stemming the flow of artworks to the United States. Their first acquisition for the National Gallery was Velázquez's Rokeby Venus in 1906, followed by Holbein's Portrait of Christina of Denmark in 1909. However, despite the crisis in aristocratic fortunes, the following decade was one of several great bequests from private collectors. In 1909 the industrialist Dr Ludwig Mond gave 42 Italian renaissance paintings, including the Mond Crucifixion by Raphael, to the Gallery. Other bequests of note were those of George Salting in 1910, Austen Henry Layard in 1916 and Sir Hugh Lane in 1917.

In the National Gallery on 10 March 1914, the Rokeby Venus was damaged by Mary Richardson, a campaigner for women's suffrage, in protest against the arrest of Emmeline Pankhurst the previous day. Later that month another suffragette attacked five Bellinis, causing the Gallery to close until the start of the First World War, when the Women's Social and Political Union called for an end to violent acts drawing attention to their plight.

The initial reception of Impressionist art at the Gallery was exceptionally controversial. In 1906, Sir Hugh Lane promised 39 paintings, including Renoir's Umbrellas, to the National Gallery on his death, unless a suitable building could be built in Dublin. Although eagerly accepted by the director Charles Holroyd, they were received with extreme hostility by the Trustees; Lord Redesdale wrote that "I would as soon expect to hear of a Mormon service being conducted in St. Paul's Cathedral as to see the exhibition of the works of the modern French Art-rebels in the sacred precincts of Trafalgar Square". Perhaps as a result of such attitudes, Lane amended his will with a codicil that the works should only go to Ireland, but crucially this was never witnessed. Lane died on board the RMS Lusitania in 1915, and a dispute began which was not resolved until 1959. Part of the collection is now on permanent loan to Dublin City Gallery ("The Hugh Lane") and other works rotate between London and Dublin every few years.

A fund for the purchase of modern paintings established by Samuel Courtauld in 1923 bought Seurat's Bathers at Asnières and other modern works for the nation; in 1934, many of these were transferred to the National Gallery from the Tate.

World War II

Shortly before the outbreak of World War II the paintings were evacuated to locations in Wales, including Penrhyn Castle, the university colleges of Bangor and Aberystwyth. In 1940, during the Battle of France, a more secure home was sought, and there were discussions about moving the paintings to Canada. This idea was firmly rejected by Winston Churchill, who wrote in a telegram to the director Kenneth Clark, "bury them in caves or in cellars, but not a picture shall leave these islands". Instead a slate quarry at Manod, near Blaenau Ffestiniog in North Wales, was requisitioned for the Gallery's use. The move to Manod confirmed the importance of storing paintings at a constant temperature and humidity, something the Gallery's conservators had long suspected but had hitherto been unable to prove. This eventually resulted in the first air-conditioned gallery opening in 1949.

For the course of the war Myra Hess, and other musicians, such as Moura Lympany, gave daily lunch-time recitals in the empty building in Trafalgar Square, to raise public morale as every concert hall in London was closed. Art exhibitions were held at the Gallery as a complement to the recitals. The first of these was British Painting since Whistler in 1940, organised by Lillian Browse, who also mounted the major joint retrospective Exhibition of Paintings by Sir William Nicholson and Jack B. Yeats held from 1 January – 15 March 1942, which was seen by 10,518 visitors. Exhibitions of work by war artists, including Paul Nash, Henry Moore and Stanley Spencer, were also held; the War Artists' Advisory Committee had been set up by Clark in order "to keep artists at work on any pretext". In 1941 a request from an artist to see Rembrandt's Portrait of Margaretha de Geer (a new acquisition) resulted in the "Picture of the Month" scheme, in which a single painting was removed from Manod and exhibited to the general public in the National Gallery each month. The art critic Herbert Read, writing that year, called the National Gallery "a defiant outpost of culture right in the middle of a bombed and shattered metropolis". The paintings returned to Trafalgar Square in 1945.

Post-war developments

In the post-war years, acquisitions have become increasingly difficult for the National Gallery as the prices for Old Masters – and even more so for the Impressionists and Post-impressionists – have risen beyond its means. Some of the Gallery's most significant purchases in this period would have been impossible without the major public appeals backing them, including The Virgin and Child with St. Anne and St. John the Baptist by Leonardo da Vinci (bought in 1962) and Titian’s Death of Actaeon (1972). The Gallery's purchase grant from the government was frozen in 1985, but later that year it received an endowment of £50 million from Sir Paul Getty, enabling many major purchases to be made. In April 1985 Lord Sainsbury of Preston Candover and his brothers, the Hon. Simon Sainsbury and Sir Timothy Sainsbury, had made a donation that would enable the construction of the Sainsbury Wing.

The directorship of Neil MacGregor saw a major rehang at the Gallery, dispensing with the classification of paintings by national school that had been introduced by Eastlake. The new chronological hang sought to emphasise the interaction between cultures rather than fixed national characteristics, reflecting the change in art historical values since the 19th century. In other respects, however, Victorian tastes were rehabilitated: the building's interiors were no longer considered an embarrassment and were restored, and in 1999 the Gallery accepted a bequest of 26 Italian Baroque paintings from Sir Denis Mahon. Earlier in the 20th century many considered the Baroque to be beyond the pale: in 1945 the Gallery's trustees declined to buy a Guercino from Mahon's collection for £200. The same painting was valued at £4 million in 2003. Mahon's bequest was made on the condition that the Gallery would never deaccession any of its paintings or charge for admission.

Jock McFadyen was the first Artist in Residence in 1981. Since 1989, the gallery has run an Associate Artist  scheme that gives a studio to contemporary artists to create work based on the permanent collection. They usually hold the position of associate artist for two years and are given an exhibition in the National Gallery at the end of their tenure.

The respective remits of the National and Tate Galleries, which had long been contested by the two institutions, were more clearly defined in 1996. 1900 was established as the cut-off point for paintings in the National Gallery, and in 1997 more than 60 post-1900 paintings from the collection were given to the Tate on a long-term loan, in return for works by Gauguin and others. However, future expansion of the National Gallery may yet see the return of 20th-century paintings to its walls.

In the 21st century there have been three large fundraising campaigns at the Gallery: in 2004, to buy Raphael's Madonna of the Pinks, in 2008, for Titian's Diana and Actaeon, and in 2012, Titian's Diana and Callisto. Both Titians were bought in tandem with the National Gallery of Scotland for £95 m. Both of these major works were sold from the collection of the Duke of Sutherland. The National Gallery is now largely priced out of the market for Old Master paintings and can only make such acquisitions with the backing of major public appeals; the departing director Charles Saumarez Smith expressed his frustration at this situation in 2007.

In 2014 the National Gallery was the subject of a documentary film by Frederick Wiseman. The film shows the gallery administration and staff at work, the conservation laboratory, guided tours and the mounting of exhibitions on Leonardo da Vinci, J.M.W. Turner and Titian in 2011–12.

Architecture

William Wilkins's building

The first suggestion for a National Gallery on Trafalgar Square came from John Nash, who envisaged it on the site of the King's Mews, while a Parthenon-like building for the Royal Academy would occupy the centre of the square. Economic recession prevented this scheme from being built, but a competition for the Mews site was eventually held in 1831, for which Nash submitted a design with C. R. Cockerell as his co-architect. Nash's popularity was waning by this time, however, and the commission was awarded to William Wilkins, who was involved in the selection of the site and submitted some drawings at the last moment. Wilkins had hoped to build a "Temple of the Arts, nurturing contemporary art through historical example", but the commission was blighted by parsimony and compromise, and the resulting building was deemed a failure on almost all counts.

The site only allowed for the building to be one room deep, as a workhouse and a barracks lay immediately behind. To exacerbate matters, there was a public right of way through the site to these buildings, which accounts for the access porticoes on the eastern and western sides of the façade. These had to incorporate columns from the demolished Carlton House and their relative shortness resulted in an elevation that was deemed excessively low, thus failing to provide Trafalgar Square with its desired commanding focal point to the north. Also recycled are the sculptures on the façade, originally intended for Nash's Marble Arch but abandoned due to his financial problems. The eastern half of the building housed the Royal Academy until 1868, which further diminished the space afforded to the National Gallery.

The building was the object of public ridicule before it had even been completed, as a version of the design had been leaked to the Literary Gazette in 1833.
Two years before completion, its infamous "pepperpot" elevation appeared on the frontispiece of Contrasts (1836), an influential tract by the Gothicist A. W. N. Pugin, as an example of the degeneracy of the classical style. Even William IV (in his last recorded utterance) thought the building a "nasty little pokey hole", while William Makepeace Thackeray called it "a little gin shop of a building". The twentieth-century architectural historian Sir John Summerson echoed these early criticisms when he compared the arrangement of a dome and two diminutive turrets on the roofline to "the clock and vases on a mantelpiece, only less useful". Sir Charles Barry's landscaping of Trafalgar Square, from 1840, included a north terrace so that the building would appear to be raised, thus addressing one of the points of complaint. In 1891 the Metropolitan Public Gardens Association placed bay trees in boxes on the railed-in terraces during the summer months. Opinion on the building had mellowed considerably by 1984, when Prince Charles called the Wilkins façade a "much-loved and elegant friend", in contrast to a proposed extension. (See below)

Alteration and expansion (Pennethorne, Barry and Taylor)
The first significant alteration made to the building was the single, long gallery added by Sir James Pennethorne in 1860–61. Ornately decorated in comparison with the rooms by Wilkins, it nonetheless worsened the cramped conditions inside the building as it was built over the original entrance hall. Unsurprisingly, several attempts were made either to completely remodel the National Gallery (as suggested by Sir Charles Barry in 1853), or to move it to more capacious premises in Kensington, where the air was also cleaner. In 1867 Barry's son Edward Middleton Barry proposed to replace the Wilkins building with a massive classical building with four domes. The scheme was a failure and contemporary critics denounced the exterior as "a strong plagiarism upon St Paul's Cathedral".

With the demolition of the workhouse, however, Barry was able to build the Gallery's first sequence of grand architectural spaces, from 1872 to 1876. Built to a polychrome Neo-Renaissance design, the Barry Rooms were arranged on a Greek cross-plan around a huge central octagon. Though it compensated for the underwhelming architecture of the Wilkins building, Barry's new wing was disliked by Gallery staff, who considered its monumental aspect to be in conflict with its function as exhibition space. Also, the decorative programme of the rooms did not take their intended contents into account; the ceiling of the 15th- and 16th-century Italian gallery, for instance, was inscribed with the names of British artists of the 19th century. However, despite these failures, the Barry Rooms provided the Gallery with a strong axial groundplan; this was to be followed by all subsequent additions to the Gallery for a century, resulting in a building of clear symmetry.

Pennethorne's gallery was demolished for the next phase of building, a scheme by Sir John Taylor extending northwards of the main entrance. Its glass-domed entrance vestibule had painted ceiling decorations by the Crace family firm, who had also worked on the Barry Rooms. A fresco intended for the south wall was never realised, and that space is now taken up by Frederic, Lord Leighton’s painting of Cimabue's Celebrated Madonna carried in Procession through the Streets of Florence (1853–1855), lent by the Royal Collection in the 1990s.

20th century: modernisation versus restoration

Later additions to the west came more steadily but maintained the coherence of the building by mirroring Barry's cross-axis plan to the east. The use of dark marble for doorcases was also continued, giving the extensions a degree of internal consistency with the older rooms. The classical style was still in use at the National Gallery in 1929, when a Beaux-Arts style gallery was built, funded by the art dealer and Trustee Lord Duveen. However, it was not long before the 20th-century reaction against Victorian attitudes became manifest at the Gallery. From 1928 to 1952 the landing floors of Taylor's entrance hall were relaid with a new series of mosaics by Boris Anrep, who was friendly with the Bloomsbury Group. These mosaics can be read as a satire on 19th-century conventions for the decoration of public buildings, as typified by the Albert Memorial's Frieze of Parnassus. The central mosaic depicting The Awakening of the Muses includes portraits of Virginia Woolf and Greta Garbo, subverting the high moral tone of its Victorian forebears. In place of Christianity's seven virtues, Anrep offered his own set of Modern Virtues, including "Humour" and "Open Mind"; the allegorical figures are again portraits of his contemporaries, including Winston Churchill, Bertrand Russell and T. S. Eliot.

In the 20th century the Gallery's late Victorian interiors fell out of fashion. The Crace ceiling decorations in the entrance hall were not to the taste of the director Charles Holmes, and were obliterated by white paint.
The North Galleries, which opened to the public in 1975, marked the arrival of modernist architecture at the National Gallery. In the older rooms, the original classical details were effaced by partitions, daises and suspended ceilings, the aim being to create neutral settings which did not distract from contemplation of the paintings. But the Gallery's commitment to modernism was short-lived: by the 1980s Victorian style was no longer considered anathema, and a restoration programme began to restore the 19th- and early-20th-century interiors to their purported original appearance. This began with the refurbishment of the Barry Rooms in 1985–86. From 1996 to 1999 even the North Galleries, by then considered to "lack a positive architectural character" were remodelled in a classical style, albeit a simplified one.

Sainsbury Wing and later additions

The most important addition to the building in recent years has been the Sainsbury Wing, designed by the postmodernist architects Robert Venturi and Denise Scott Brown to house the collection of Renaissance paintings, and built in 1991. The building occupies the "Hampton's site" to the west of the main building, where a department store of the same name had stood until its destruction in the Blitz. The Gallery had long sought expansion into this space and in 1982 a competition was held to find a suitable architect; the shortlist included a radical high-tech proposal by Richard Rogers, among others. The design that won the most votes was by the firm Ahrends, Burton and Koralek, who then modified their proposal to include a tower, similar to that of the Rogers scheme. The proposal was dropped after the Prince of Wales compared the design to a "monstrous carbuncle on the face of a much-loved and elegant friend", The term "monstrous carbuncle", for a modern building that clashes with its surroundings, has since become commonplace.

One of the conditions of the 1982 competition was that the new wing had to include commercial offices as well as public gallery space. However, in 1985 it became possible to devote the extension entirely to the Gallery's uses, due to a donation of almost £50 million from Lord Sainsbury and his brothers Simon and Sir Tim Sainsbury. A closed competition was held, and the schemes produced were noticeably more restrained than in the earlier competition.

In contrast with the rich ornamentation of the main building, the galleries in the Sainsbury Wing are pared-down and intimate, to suit the smaller scale of many of the paintings. The main inspirations for these rooms are Sir John Soane's toplit galleries for the Dulwich Picture Gallery and the church interiors of Filippo Brunelleschi (the stone dressing is in pietra serena, the grey stone local to Florence). The northernmost galleries align with Barry's central axis, so that there is a single vista down the whole length of the Gallery. This axis is exaggerated by the use of false perspective, as the columns flanking each opening gradually diminish in size until the visitor reaches the focal point (as of 2009), an altarpiece by Cima of The Incredulity of St Thomas. Venturi's postmodernist approach to architecture is in full evidence at the Sainsbury Wing, with its stylistic quotations from buildings as disparate as the clubhouses on Pall Mall, the Scala Regia in the Vatican, Victorian warehouses and Ancient Egyptian temples.

Following the pedestrianisation of Trafalgar Square, the Gallery is currently engaged in a masterplan to convert the vacated office space on the ground floor into public space. The plan will also fill in disused courtyards and make use of land acquired from the adjoining National Portrait Gallery in St Martin's Place, which it gave to the National Gallery in exchange for land for its 2000 extension. The first phase, the East Wing Project designed by Jeremy Dixon and Edward Jones, opened to the public in 2004. This provided a new ground level entrance from Trafalgar Square, named in honour of Sir Paul Getty. The main entrance was also refurbished, and reopened in September 2005. Possible future projects include a "West Wing Project" roughly symmetrical with the East Wing Project, which would provide a future ground level entrance, and the public opening of some small rooms at the far eastern end of the building acquired as part of the swap with the National Portrait Gallery. This might include a new public staircase in the bow on the eastern façade. No timetable has been announced for these additional projects.

In April 2021, a jury short-listed six firms of architects – Caruso St John, David Chipperfield Architects, Asif Kahn, David Kohn Architects, Selldorf Architects, and Witherford Watson Mann Architects – in a competition for design proposals to upgrade the Sainsbury Wing.

Controversies

One of the most persistent criticisms of the National Gallery, apart from those who criticise inadequacies of the building, has been of its conservation policy. The Gallery's detractors accused it of having had an over-zealous approach to restoration. The first cleaning operation at the National Gallery began in 1844 after Eastlake's appointment as Keeper, and was the subject of attacks in the press after the first three paintings to receive the treatment – a Rubens, a Cuyp and a Velázquez – were unveiled to the public in 1846. The Gallery's most virulent critic was J. Morris Moore, who wrote a series of letters to The Times under the pseudonym "Verax" savaging the institution's cleanings. While an 1853 Parliamentary Select committee set up to investigate the matter cleared the Gallery of any wrongdoing, criticism of its methods has been erupting sporadically ever since from some in the art establishment.

The last major outcry against the use of radical conservation techniques at the National Gallery was in the immediate post-war years, following a restoration campaign by Chief Restorer Helmut Ruhemann while the paintings were in Manod Quarry. When the cleaned pictures were exhibited to the public in 1946 there followed a furore with parallels to that of a century earlier. The principal criticism was that the extensive removal of varnish, which was used in the 19th century to protect the surface of paintings but which darkened and discoloured over time, may have resulted in the loss of "harmonising" glazes added to the paintings by the artists themselves. The opposition to Ruhemann's techniques was led by Ernst Gombrich, a professor at the Warburg Institute who in later correspondence with a restorer described being treated with "offensive superciliousness" by the National Gallery. A 1947 commission concluded that no damage had been done in the recent cleanings.

The National Gallery's attribution of paintings has been disputed on occasion. Kenneth Clark's decision in 1939 to label a group of paintings from the Venetian school as works by Giorgione was controversial at the time and the panels were soon identified as works by Andrea Previtali by a junior curator Clark had appointed. Decades later, the attribution of a 17th-century painting of Samson and Delilah (bought in 1980) to Rubens has been contested by a group of art historians, who believe that the National Gallery has not admitted the mistake to avoid embarrassing those who were involved in the purchase, many of whom still work for the Gallery.

The National Gallery was sponsored by the Italian arms manufacturer Finmeccanica between October 2011 and October 2012. The sponsorship deal allowed the company to use gallery spaces for gatherings and they used it to host delegates during the DSEI arms fair and the Farnborough international air show. The sponsorship deal was ended a year early after protests.

In February 2014, Men of the Docks, by U.S. artist George Bellows, was bought by the National Gallery for $25.5 million (£15.6 million). It was the first major American painting to be purchased by the Gallery. Director Nicholas Penny termed the painting a new direction for the Gallery, a non-European painting in a European style. Its sale was controversial in the U.S. The Gallery was found in 2018 to be one of the first London public galleries to charge more than £20 for admission to a special exhibition of works by Claude Monet.

In February 2019 an Employment Tribunal ruled that the Gallery had incorrectly classed its team of educators as self-employed contractors. The educators were awarded 'worker' status following legal action brought by twenty-seven claimants. The case received considerable press and media coverage.

Incidents
In 2015, UK group Trollstation pretended that they were stealing money and art work, prompting an emergency services response. Various members of the group were arrested and jailed.

The museum's copy of Vincent van Gogh's Sunflowers was attacked on 14 October 2022 by environmental activists from the Just Stop Oil campaign, who threw tomato soup at it while it was on display. Due to the protection of the plexiglass, the painting was not harmed, but it suffered some minor damage to the frame, according to a spokesperson for the museum.

List of directors

Collection highlights 

 Cimabue: Virgin and Child with Two Angels
 Giotto: Pentecost
 English or French Medieval: Wilton Diptych
 Jan van Eyck: Arnolfini Portrait, Portrait of a Man (Self Portrait?)
 Pisanello: The Vision of Saint Eustace
 Paolo Uccello: The Battle of San Romano, Saint George and the Dragon
 Rogier van der Weyden: The Magdalen Reading
 Masaccio: Madonna and Child
 Dieric Bouts: The Entombment
 Piero della Francesca: Baptism of Christ
 Antonello da Messina: Portrait of a Man, St Jerome in his Study
 Giovanni Bellini: Agony in the Garden, Madonna del Prato, Portrait of Doge Leonardo Loredan
 Antonio and Piero del Pollaiuolo: Martyrdom of Saint Sebastian
 Sandro Botticelli: Venus and Mars, The Mystical Nativity
 Hieronymus Bosch: Christ Crowned with Thorns
 Leonardo da Vinci: Virgin of the Rocks, The Virgin and Child with Saint Anne and Saint John the Baptist
 Albrecht Dürer: St Jerome in the Wilderness
 Michelangelo: The Entombment, The Manchester Madonna
 Jan Gossaert: Adoration of the Kings
 Raphael: Garvagh Madonna, Ansidei Madonna, Portrait of Pope Julius II, The Madonna of the Pinks, Mond Crucifixion, Vision of a Knight
 Titian: Aldobrandini Madonna, Allegory of Prudence, Bacchus and Ariadne, Diana and Actaeon, Diana and Callisto, The Death of Actaeon, A Man with a Quilted Sleeve, Portrait of the Vendramin Family
 Hans Holbein the Younger: The Ambassadors, Portrait of Christina of Denmark
 Parmigianino: Portrait of a Collector, Vision of Saint Jerome
 Agnolo Bronzino: Venus, Cupid, Folly and Time
 Tintoretto: The Origin of the Milky Way
 Pieter Bruegel the Elder: Adoration of the Kings
 Paolo Veronese: The Family of Darius before Alexander, The Conversion of Mary Magdalene, Adoration of the Magi 
 El Greco: Christ Driving the Money Changers from the Temple
 Caravaggio: Boy Bitten by a Lizard, Supper at Emmaus, Salome with the Head of John the Baptist
 Peter Paul Rubens: The Judgement of Paris
 Orazio Gentileschi: The Finding of Moses
 Artemisia Gentileschi: Self-Portrait as Saint Catherine of Alexandria
 Nicolas Poussin: The Adoration of the Golden Calf
 Diego Velázquez: Christ in the House of Martha and Mary, Philip IV in Brown and Silver, Rokeby Venus
 Anthony van Dyck: Equestrian Portrait of Charles I, Lord John Stuart and his Brother, Lord Bernard Stuart
 Claude Lorrain: Seaport with the Embarkation of the Queen of Sheba
 Rembrandt: Self-Portrait at the Age of 34, Belshazzar's Feast, Self-Portrait at the Age of 63
 Johannes Vermeer: Lady Standing at a Virginal, Lady Seated at a Virginal
 Meindert Hobbema: The Avenue at Middelharnis
 Canaletto: The Stonemason's Yard
 William Hogarth: The Graham Children, Marriage à-la-mode
 George Stubbs: Whistlejacket
 Thomas Gainsborough: Mr and Mrs Andrews, The Morning Walk
 Joseph Wright of Derby: An Experiment on a Bird in the Air Pump
 Francisco Goya: Portrait of the Duke of Wellington
 J. M. W. Turner: The Fighting Temeraire, Rain, Steam and Speed – The Great Western Railway
 John Constable: The Cornfield, The Hay Wain
 Jean Auguste Dominique Ingres: Madame Moitessier
 Eugène Delacroix: Ovid among the Scythians
 Edgar Degas: Miss La La at the Cirque Fernando, Young Spartans Exercising
 Paul Cézanne: Les Grandes Baigneuses
 Claude Monet: Snow at Argenteuil, La Gare Saint-Lazare
 Pierre-Auguste Renoir: The Umbrellas, A Nymph by a Stream
 Henri Rousseau: Tiger in a Tropical Storm (Surprised!)
 Vincent van Gogh: Sunflowers, A Wheatfield with Cypresses
 Georges Seurat: Bathers at Asnières

Transport connections

See also

 Micro gallery, installed in 1991.

Explanatory notes

References

Citations

General sources

External links 
 
 The National Gallery at Pall Mall from Survey of London
 30 highlight paintings at nationalgallery.org
 Virtual tour of the National Gallery provided by Google Arts & Culture
 

 
1824 establishments in the United Kingdom
Art museums and galleries in London
Art museums established in 1824
Buildings and structures completed in 1838
Charities based in London
Domes
Exempt charities
Georgian architecture in the City of Westminster
Government agencies established in 1824
Grade I listed buildings in the City of Westminster
Grade I listed museum buildings
Greek Revival architecture in the United Kingdom
Museums in the City of Westminster
Museums sponsored by the Department for Digital, Culture, Media and Sport
Neoclassical architecture in London
Non-departmental public bodies of the United Kingdom government
Order of Arts and Letters of Spain recipients
Edward Middleton Barry buildings